Tubersent is a commune in the Pas-de-Calais department in the Hauts-de-France region of France.

History
First mentioned in the 9th century as "Thorbodessem" (or "Thornbodeshem" in 877), the place later (1097) was called "Turbodessem".

Places of interest
 The church of St. Etienne, dating from the sixteenth century
 Site of a battle between Ligueurs and royalists in 1591.
 Motte of an old castle.
 A farm dating from the eighteenth century (1735).
 A water mill.

Geography
Tubersent is located 5 miles (8 km) northeast of Montreuil-sur-Mer on the D145 road.

Population

See also
Communes of the Pas-de-Calais department

References

Communes of Pas-de-Calais